Yixin Chen is a computer scientist, academic, and author. He is a professor of computer science and engineering at Washington University in St. Louis.

Chen’s research interests are focused on computer sciences, with a particular focus on the fields of machine learning, deep learning, data mining, and computational biomedicine. He has contributed to several publications and has written several book chapters, including Clustering Parallel Data Streams and The Evaluation of Partitioned Temporal Planning Problems in Discrete Space and its Application in ASPEN. He also co-authored the book Introduction to Explainable Artificial Intelligence.

Chen is an elected IEEE Fellow for his contributions towards deep learning systems. He also served as a Program Co-Chair for IEEE Conference on Big Data 2021.

Education
Chen completed his Bachelor’s in Computer Science from the University of Science and Technology of China in 1999 and Master’s in Computer Science from the University of Illinois at Urbana-Champaign in 2001. He then pursued his Ph.D. in computer science from the University of Illinois at Urbana-Champaign under the guidance of Benjamin Wah and completed it in 2005.

Career
Chen started his academic career as an Assistant Professor at the Department of Computer Science and Engineering at Washington University in St. Louis in 2005. In 2010, he was appointed as an Associate Professor at the Department of Computer Science and Engineering at Washington University in St. Louis. As of 2016, he is a Professor at the Department of Computer Science and Engineering at Washington University in St. Louis. He is the Director of the Center for Collaborative Human-AI Learning and Operation (HALO) at Washington University.

Chen has taken a leave from academia and served as the Chief Data Officer (CDO) and later Chief Technology Officer (CTO) of China Asset Management (ChinaAMC). He was named Leader of the Year for Digital Transformation in Finance, at the 2020 Sensors Data-Driven Conference.

Research
Chen has authored numerous publications. His research interests are focused in the fields of machine learning, applications of artificial intelligence in healthcare, optimization algorithms, data mining, and computational biomedicine.

Resource efficient machine learning
Chen has done significant research on compactness and applicability of deep neural networks (DNNs). He proposed the concept and architecture of lightweight DNNs. His group invented the HashedNets architecture, which compresses prohibitively large DNNs into much smaller networks using a weight-sharing scheme.

Chen also developed a compression frameworks for convolutional neural networks (CNNs). His lab invented a frequency-sensitive compression technique in which more important model parameters are better preserved, leading to state-of-the-art compression results.

Deep learning on graphs and time series
Chen has made significant contributions to graph neural networks (GNNs). Chen and his students proposed one of the first graph convolution techniques that can learn a meaningful tensor representation from arbitrary graphs, and showed its deep connection to the Weisfeiler-Lehman algorithm. They are the first to apply GNNs to link prediction and matrix completion and achieved world record results.

For time series classification, Chen advocated using a multi-scale convolutional neuronal network, also known as MCNN, citing its computational efficiency. He illustrated that MCNN brings out features at varying frequencies and scales by leveraging GPU computing, contrary to other frameworks that can only retract features at a single-time-scale.

Deep learning for healthcare
Chen studied deep learning, focusing on its implications on public healthcare systems. He and his collaborators suggested using a deep-learning model to predict the readmission pattern of hospital patients and proposed a model that utilizes both conventional statistical data via conclusive feature embedding and input from convolutional neural networks. This allows the end user to make use of local and temporal information along with the evaluation of overall trends. They also created a prediction model for 30-day postoperative mortality by using a deep-learning model and asserted that the deep-learning model could be highly efficient, especially if compared with oversimplified intraoperative data precisely due to its ability to detect real-time changes. He also proposed applying the deep learning model to manage electronic health records more efficiently. He further emphasized that the induction of the deep learning method would streamline the process of electroencephalogram, electrocardiography, genomics, and drug analysis precisely due to its unparalleled learning ability.

Awards and honors
2006 – Early Career Principal Investigator Award, Department of Energy
2007 – Microsoft Research New Faculty Fellowship
2010 –  Outstanding Paper Award, AAAI Conference on Artificial Intelligence
2020 – Leader of the Year for Digital Transformation in Finance, Sensors Data-Driven Conference
2022 – Fellow, Institute of Electrical and Electronics Engineers

Bibliography

Books
Introduction to Explainable Artificial Intelligence (2022) ISBN 9787121431876

Selected articles
Chen, Y., & Tu, L. (2007, August). Density-based clustering for real-time stream data. In Proceedings of the 13th ACM SIGKDD international conference on Knowledge discovery and data mining (pp. 133–142).
Chen, W., Wilson, J., Tyree, S., Weinberger, K., & Chen, Y. (2015, June). Compressing neural networks with the hashing trick. In International conference on machine learning (pp. 2285–2294). PMLR.
Cui, Z., Chen, W., & Chen, Y. (2016). Multi-scale convolutional neural networks for time series classification. arXiv preprint arXiv:1603.06995.
Zhang, M., Cui, Z., Neumann, M., & Chen, Y. (2018, April). An end-to-end deep learning architecture for graph classification. In Proceedings of the AAAI conference on artificial intelligence (Vol. 32, No. 1).
Zhang, M., & Chen, Y. (2018). Link prediction based on graph neural networks. Advances in neural information processing systems, 31.

References 

Living people
University of Science and Technology of China alumni
University of Illinois Urbana-Champaign alumni
Washington University in St. Louis faculty
Year of birth missing (living people)